httperf (pronounced h-t-t-perf) is a testing tool to measure the performance of web servers.  It was originally developed by David Mosberger and other staff at Hewlett-Packard Research Laboratories.

httperf is able to test HTTP pipelining workloads.

References 

 Webの負荷テストに使えるフリーソフトウェア, ITmedia
 D. Mosberger and T. Jin. httperf: A Tool for Measuring Web Server Performance . Performance Evaluation Review, Volume 26, Number 3, December 1998, 31-37. (Originally appeared in Proceedings of the 1998 Internet Server Performance Workshop, June 1998, 59-67.)

External links 
 httperf github repository

Hypertext Transfer Protocol